This article summarizes the outcomes of all official matches played by the North Korea national football team by opponent and by period, since they first played in official competitions in 1956.

Record per opponent
Last updated: North Korea vs Lebanon, 19 November 2019. Statistics include official FIFA-recognised matches only.

Key

The following table shows North Korea's all-time official international record per opponent:

Results in chronological order

The summarizing tables below show North Korea's official matches per period. More extensive reports (with dates, scores, goal scorers and match circumstances) can be found on the main articles per period.

1956–1979

82 matches played:

1980–1999

100 matches played:

2000–2009

102 matches played:

2010–2019

118 matches played:

2020–present

See also
 North Korea women's national football team results

Notes

References